Mellilä is a former municipality of Finland. It was merged to the town of Loimaa on 1 January 2009.

It is located in the province of Western Finland and is part of the Southwest Finland region. The municipality had a population of 1,254 (2004-12-31) and covered an area of 110.62 km² of which 0.10 km² is water. The population density was 11.35 inhabitants per km².

The municipality was unilingually Finnish.

Gallery

External links

Mellilän kyläyhdistys ry 

Former municipalities of Finland
Loimaa
Populated places disestablished in 2009
2009 disestablishments in Finland